These are the team rosters of the two teams competing for the 2011 FIBA Oceania Championship.

|}
| valign="top" |
 Head coach
 
 Assistant coach(es)
 
 
 Technical assistant 
 
 Strength & conditioning coach
 
 

Legend
 (C) Team captain
 Club field describes current pro club 
|}

|}
| valign="top" |
 Head coach
 
 Assistant coach(es)
 
 
 Physiotherapist
 
 General manager 
 

Legend
(C) Team captain
Club field describes current pro club

|}

References 
 FIBA Oceania Championship 2011

FIBA Oceania Championship squads
2011–12 in Oceanian basketball
2011 in New Zealand basketball
2011–12 in Australian basketball